Stelis avirostris is a species of orchid plant native to Ecuador.

References 

avirostris
Flora of Ecuador
Plants described in 2001